Rembrandt's Wife is a chamber opera composed by Andrew Ford with libretto by Sue Smith.

It explores the relationships of Dutch artist Rembrandt with three women: the death of his wife Saskia, the madness of his former lover Geertje Dircx and his muse to be, Hendrickje Stoffels. Smith was inspired to write the opera when, at an exhibition of the artist's etchings, she learned that he sold the burial plot and headstone of his wife.

Victorian Opera premiered the work at the CUB Malthouse, Melbourne in April 2009, conducted by Richard Gill.

For Rembrandt's Wife, Ford and Smith received a Melbourne Green Room Award for New Australian Opera. Smith's libretto received the AWGIE Award for Music Theatre in 2010.

References

2009 operas
English-language operas
Operas
Works about Rembrandt
Operas set in the 17th century
Cultural depictions of Dutch women
Operas set in the Netherlands
Cultural depictions of Rembrandt
Operas based on real people